The Pálházi State Forest Railway is a  narrow gauge railway in Hungary. It is operated by ÉSZAKERDŐ Zrt, who also operate the Lillafüredi Állami Erdei Vasút.

Motive Power

References

Narrow gauge railways in Hungary